Clyde Wilson may refer to:
 Clyde Wilson (politician) (1889–1971), British politician
 Clyde H. Wilson (1889–after 1928), American college football and basketball coach
 Slim Wilson or Clyde Wilson (1910–1990), American singer, songwriter, bandleader, and radio and TV personality
 Clyde A. Wilson (1923–2008), American detective and private investigator
 H. Clyde Wilson Jr. (1926–2010), American professor of anthropology
 Clyde N. Wilson (born 1941), American professor of history, paleoconservative political commentator, writer and editor
 Clyde Wilson (cyclist) (born 1959), Bermudian Olympic cyclist

See also
 Wilson Clyde (born 1934)